The All Japan Fuji 1000 km, was the sixth round of the 1990 All Japan Sports Prototype Championship and the fourth round of the 1990 Fuji Long Distance Series which was held at the Fuji International Speedway, on October 7th, in front of a crowd of approximately 41,000.

Report

Entry
A total of 19 cars were entered for the event, in two classes, one for cars running to Group C1 specification and the other to IMSA GTP regulations.

Qualifying
The Nissan Motorsport car of Anders Olofsson and Masahiro Hasemi took pole position, in their Nissan R90CP ahead of team mates Kazuyoshi Hoshino and Toshio Suzuki, by 0.428secs.

Race
The race was held over 224 laps of the Fuji circuit, a distance of 1000 km (actual distance was 1001.28 km). Second place went to Kazuyoshi Hoshino and Toshio Suzuki in the pole sitting Nissan Motorsport’s Nissan R90CP who finished about 1 minute and 18 seconds adrift. Five laps down, in third place was the Alpha Racing Porsche 962 C of Stanley Dickens and Will Hoy.

Classification

Result
Class Winners are in Bold text.

 Fastest lap: Masahiro Hasemi/Anders Olofsson, 1:16:728secs.

References

All Japan Sports Prototype Championship
Fuji Long Distance Series
All Japan Fuji 1000km
6 Hours of Fuji
Fuji